Villainous is a Mexican animated television web series produced by A.I. Animation Studios for Cartoon Network and HBO Max. It was created by Alan Ituriel, a veteran of the animation industry in Mexico. It is based on a 2012 web series of the same name which Ituriel had previously created and was initially picked up by Cartoon Network Latin America as a miniseries of ten one-minute episodes for the Cartoon Network Anything app (further episodes, along with a series of specials, were released later). The series is co-produced by Cartoon Network (through its Latin America Original Production unit) and A.I. Animation Studios.

On October 11, 2021, Ituriel's A.I. Animation Studios revealed that the series would be released on HBO Max Latin America and Cartoon Network Mexico, and premiered on both platforms on October 29, 2021.

Plot
Villainous is the story of Black Hat Org., run by the evil mastermind Black Hat (whose name is a synonym for villain, a reference to black-hatted evil cowboys from western movies), and his team of three less-villainous aides. Black Hat Org's mission is to assist other villains to solve their heroic problems. They sell evil inventions created by Dr. Flug and offer various services, such as advice on how to defeat the hero or take care of the hero themselves. However, things usually end up going wrong as the brilliant innovations and plans tend to have small and often comical flaws.

Characters

Main
Black Hat (voiced by Alan Ituriel) is an ancient and malevolent mastermind of unknown origin or species who runs Black Hat Org., appears in all of the ads that the company produces, and is hinted to be the source of all evil in the multiverse. Black Hat is able to do everything that he wants, his possibilities are absolutely endless, but in the show we saw only a little part of them. For example shapeshift, teleport in several fashions, manipulating space and reality, conjure objects at will, and can open portals to other dimensions with his claws (sometimes even to other Cartoon Network shows). He is shown to be able to play the pipe organ and a violin with strings made of cat guts. Black Hat is shown to wear a smaller, black bowler hat beneath his signature top hat. An alternate, muscular Black Hat in "The Perception of Evil" was voiced by Markiplier, but in Spanish and English was voiced by Ituriel himself. He is about 6'8" or 203 cm with the tophat and 5'10.5" or 178 cm without. He also owns a snake named Lil 'Jack, carries a walking stick he created from his own shadow, and can make people go out of their minds if he sings. and that he does not need to sleep.

Dr. Kenning "Flug" Flugslys (voiced by Yian Ruiz (English, TV series), Todd Sayre (English, pilot/shorts)  and José Antonio Macías (Spanish)) is a nervous, nerdy, but somewhat kind and respectful scientist who wears multiple paper bags over his head who works for Black Hat. Flugslys means 'aviation accident' or 'plane crash' in Icelandic and Flug has obtained his driver's and pilot's license. Nobody has ever seen his face, except, according to someone working on the show, Black Hat himself. According to a tweet by Alan Ituriel, the reason behind his bag will be revealed once the mini-series becomes a show. He is about 5'9" or 177 cm tall. Despite his kind nature, Flug can be violent, malicious, and cruel when need be. Not only is one of his aliases "La Bolsa de Torta" (The Sandwich Bag), but he loves pancakes and used to play the flute in elementary school. He is 24–25 years old.
Demencia "Dem" (voiced by Cindy Eliz Pérez (English, TV series), Melaney Sems (English, pilot/shorts) and Melissa Gedeón (Spanish)) is Black Hat's crazed fan and assistant who wears a tracking device. Her outfit is inspired by reptiles and she has a love for destruction, chaos, and mischief. If she crouches down, because of her hair's massive length and color, her hair covers her body and she resembles a lizard. She is seen to be able to play the electric guitar and her favorite song is "Revolution 9" by The Beatles. She is hinted to be an experiment and is 19–20 years old. She is about 5'7" or 170 cm tall. She can crawl on walls, has enhanced senses, has seemingly superhuman levels of strength despite her thin build, and has shown several times to be cannibalistic.
5.0.5. (voiced by Mark Fischbach) is one of the Organization's failed experiments that cannot be killed. Intended to be an evil creature, he instead became very loving and enjoys hugging his friends. He is a big blue bear creature with a single flower sprouting from his head that wilts and grows based on his emotions, and closes when he is asleep. He seems to be the organization's housekeeper. 5.0.5 sees Dr. Flug as a father more than a creator and sees Demencia as his troublesome sister. Black Hat, however, sees him as a personal punching bag to relieve stress. He is about 7'6" or 228 cm tall, including the flower. He is also about 5 years old in bear years and has been with the group for two years.

Supporting
Cam Bot is the one who films all of Black Hat Org.'s ads. It is a sentient camera with useful attachments, however, the make-up puff arm was removed by Black Hat when it attempted to use it on him.
Penumbra / Dr. Penelope Numan Braxton (voiced by Jinon Deeb (English, redubbed pilot), Amanda Rose (English, original pilot) and Rebeca Manríquez (Spanish) is a villainess of Arteno City. she suffers a skin condition that she accidentally made called "Numbra Disorder" which gets her burn when in contact with the sun, half of Arteno's population (who are now called "Numbras") are also infected by the condition due to an incident involving a toxic cloud she caused from inventing something to help the environment, because of these events Arteno City now treated the Numbras as Second-class citizens and segregated them to the northside of the city. She tries to obstruct the sun in numerous ways but they are always thwarted by Sunblast, the superhero of Arteno City who acts like a bully towards her. She wears a white lab coat and has shadowy transparent hair that reveals a black line behind her head. She has an Instagram account where she claims she will "save the planet!"

P.E.A.C.E.
Ringworm (voiced by series' head animator Stephen Schoer Silva (Spanish) and Sean Davis (English)), a hero with ringworm (hence the name) who has the ability to generate ring bolts.
Bicep (voiced by Roly Gutierrez (English) and Daniel del Robe (Spanish)), a boxer superhero who resembles Sylvester Stallone's Rocky Balboa character from the Rocky film series, whom has superhuman strength.
G-Lo / Gloria Grentina (voiced by Yenni Ann (English) and Alicia Velez (Spanish)), a gelatinous heroine (hence her name) with the ability to stretch her limbs. She was Bicep's sidekick but after Bicep got beat up by the super villain Black Hot, she became a sidekick for hire.
Bulldozer (voiced by series writer Diego Valenzuela (Spanish) and David Steel (English)), a buff construction worker-themed superhero with a wrecking ball for a hand whom he names "Berry" and also talks for her. He claims to be afraid of nothing except for bears (including 505) because that's how he lost his hand.

Other characters
Airlock / Amanda Hamilton Weaver (voiced by Jinon Deebs (English, unmasked), Doug Turkel (English, masked) and Rebeca Patiño (Spanish)), a superheroine with a robotic arm who resembles Samus Aran from the Metroid game series.
Black Hot / Sexy Black Hat (voiced by Mark Fischbach (English), Alan Ituriel (Spanish)), a "clone" of Black Hat created by the Evil ray in "The Perception of Evil", He was created by Demencia. In "BH's Bizzare Bad-Venture" he runs away and created his own organization with stronger opposites of Flug, Demencia and 505 (who is just a cactus).
Bonnivet (voiced by series animator Carolina Páez), a character that first appears in "The Lost Cases of Elmore", is a Supreme Leader of some type.
Curie is the pet rat of Penumbra which was once used for experiments in a laboratory in Atreno City until Penumbra rescued it.
Dark Phantom / Ezequiel Aterborn VI (voiced by series animator Daniel Hoyo on Orientation #10, Pascual Meza in S1E6 (Spanish) and Sahid Pabon (English)), first appears in "The Lost Cases of Rhyboflavin" and is a professional villain, who is secretive. He is accompanied by his henchman Ghoul (voiced by Jason Kesser (English) and Alejandro Orozco (Spanish)).
Earl also called Dopey Black Hat, is a "clone" of Black Hat created by Monstrous Black Hat in "The Perception of Evil".
El Valiente / Pedro Moreno (voiced by Jose Aparicio (English) and Guillermo Coria (Spanish)), a famous Mexican luchador whose mind was controlled by the cursed wrestling mask Mascara Macabra (voiced by Aparicio (English) and Humberto Vélez (Spanish)), whom he won from a match against him. The mask gives him superhuman strength yet drives him to obsession over being victorious. His wife, former P.E.A.C.E. operative Adelita Guerrero (voiced by Margarita Coego (English) and Magdalena Leonel (Spanish)) approached the Black Hat Organization to rescue him from the mask.
Emilia (voiced by Lourdes Arruti (Spanish) and Jackie Rodriguez (English)), an orphaned ghost girl who lives in a haunted house along with other children spirits.
Hatbot-lers robots created in the image of Black Hat. 
Hatbot-Sentinels also known as Hatbots, are Black Hat-looking robots that belong to a Black Hat Organization robot line specifically designed to cause havoc during Christmas time celebrations. 
Goldheart / Herbert Leth (voiced by Oliver Roberts (English, original pilot) and Edson Matus (Spanish)) is a superhero who was Dr. Flug's rival and former nemesis during his years in high school, Flug still has a grudge against him and finds out by Miss Heed that he's going to stop villainy once and for all.
Illuminarrow, a villain with an Eye of Providence motif who was created by Ami Guillén and Aleck Parker as a joke. Ami did not accept Illuminarrow as her daughter and abandoned her, hence her evilness.
Lady Naga is a female villainess who briefly appears in "Q&A Black Hat Organization replies" during a slideshow while Flug lists off examples of respectable female villains. 
The Men Without Hats is a unknown organization that plans to overthrow Black Hat, there presence are shown as secret messages at the end of the title sequence.
Metauro / Dimas Reldón Soler (voiced by Diego Valenzuela),  a "professional villain" that was threatened and used to advertise Black Hat Organization's evil plans for villains. 
Miss Heed / Cecilia Amanda Kelly (voiced by Katherine Clavelo (English) and Cristina Hernández (Spanish)), a very well-known superheroine, influencer, and designer who has her own merchandise that includes perfumes, action figures, and dolls. It is revealed that she was a friend of Flug's during high school, who aims for the affections of Goldheart. She has the ability to evaporate liquids, and she uses it to blow air kisses modified with the formula of her perfume and put her foes in an obedient love-trance. Though she may be a hero she has an obsession for attention due to her controlling both villains and civilians as mindless followers and planned to make a stronger perfume to mind control the entire globe to become the most beloved hero in the world just so Goldheart could love her again. She was revealed by Alan Ituriel in Villainous Chat at Pixelatl 2020.
Monstrous Black Hat, a "clone" of Black Hat created by the Evil ray in "The Perception of Evil". He was created by 5.0.5. 
The Pirate, an unnamed character who first appeared in the webisode "Hooked". He is a ship captain, and the victim of an unnamed magical boy's taunting.
Sunblast / Saúl Solis (voiced by Roly Gutiérrez (English, redubbed pilot), Herschel "IV" Hatcher (English, original pilot) and Manuel Pérez (Spanish), a powerful superhero of Arteno City and Penumbra's arch-enemy, he acts more like a school bully instead of a hero as he cares more for his popularity from Arteno's citizens and hates nerds. He was then defeated by Dr. Flug and his colleagues and shrink him down which Penumbra takes custody of him where they later become friends.
V.I.R.U.S. (voiced by Sean Davis (English) and Raúl Anaya (Spanish)), an artificial intelligence that inhabits a space station who plans to expose vital information on the internet (which was actually the leaked final episode of Flug's favorite show "Code: Turkey"), the government hired superheroine Airlock to erase him from the internet which leads him to ask Black Hat's associates for help.
Vanity Bolt, a character that first appears in "The Lost Cases of Rhyboflavin". Dark Phantom is his enemy.

Production and release
The original Villainous webisodes were written, animated, and voiced by Alan Ituriel in 2012 for ThatPlaceToHangOut.com, an art website he jointly worked on. He had to use royalty-free music and voice all characters. He later said he was inspired by Guillermo del Toro and Captain Hook in Peter Pan. During the production of the new series, Cartoon Network was able to sign on YouTuber and popular Internet gamer Markiplier as the voice of 5.0.5. and attached a professional composer, Kevin Manthei, both upon request by Ituriel, to the project. Ituriel remained in control over most aspects as director, writer, storyboard artist, animator and voice of Black Hat. The English version is initially recorded first at TRACKS Productions using an Atlanta-based cast (with the exception of Ituriel and Markiplier) while the Spanish version was dubbed afterward at Dubbing House in Mexico. Apart from Ituriel, Markiplier, and Manthei, Carolina Paez was an animator, as was Kevin Martínez, and Diego Valenzuela wrote various episodes. A teaser trailer was also released on September 8, 2018.

The Villainous concept was pitched by Alan Ituriel at a contest run at the Pixelatl Festival in Cuernavaca, called IdeaToon Summit, in 2014. He met some Cartoon Network executives there and the concept was judged to fit the 6-11 year old demographic for CN Anything original content. Villainous has garnered very positive reception on Cartoon Network's online platforms, like the Cartoon Network's Anything application in 2016, leading CN to decide to continue their own "Pitch Me" competition through at least 2017 in an aim to find more web original shows. Villainous is the first of what CN hopes to be many successful short projects for their app and YouTube channel.

A TV pilot was released on June 8, 2019, with the Spanish-language version released seven days earlier, while a full-length series is currently in development. Ituriel later confirmed that season one is currently in production, while also announcing a new character, with a backdoor pilot later debuting as the Victor and Valentino episode "Villainy In Monte Macabre." Unlike the shorts, due to Warner Bros. merger with Discovery and the Covid-19 pandemic, while simultaneously produced in both languages (with scripts still written in English), the series was recorded in Spanish first at SDI Media in Mexico and dubbed in English afterwards replacing most of the original cast with a Miami-based cast at VOA Studios Miami, released on November 24, 2022.

On October 11, 2021, it was revealed that the series would be released on HBO Max Latin America and Cartoon Network Mexico, and it premiered on both platforms on October 29, 2021.

Locations

Fictitious locations
Villainous does not take place in any existing city. The main setting is in a city on Hat Island, where the Black Hat mansion is located, which is Black Hat's residence and the headquarters of the Black Hat Organization. In each chapter the protagonists are sent to a different city or location to fulfill a mission that can occur within a single place, such as an abandoned mansion or in outer space. In the pilot of the series, "The Dreadful Dawn", they are sent to a city called Atreno City for a Penumbra contract to defeat a hero named Sunblast. In episode 6, "The Heedeous Heart", they travel to the city where Miss Heed is, possibly called Cosmopolis.

Real locations
The title of episode 3, "THE VVV", refers to the Mexican wrestling films of the 60s (mostly starring El Santo). On that occasion Black Hat Organization was renamed "Sombrero Negro, S.A." (the names of Mexican companies commonly end in S.A., for "Sociedad Anónima") and the protagonists are sent to a Mexican wrestling arena located in a city called Guadalajarra (reference to the city of Guadalajara, Jalisco). At the end they are teleported to a desert by Black Hat. The characters visit places in Mexico that refer to this as the National Museum of Anthropology, the city of Acapulco, Guerrero; the city of Papantla, Veracruz and Xochimilco in Mexico City.

Episodes
Note: Episodes are produced in English and dubbed in Spanish afterward.

Pilot (2019)

Season 1 (2021)

Shorts

Phase One
The first wave of Spanish-language shorts which were released on a video on the Cartoon Network Latin America YouTube channel.

Phase Two

Orientation Videos for Villains
This is a series of 10-to-11-minute Spanish-language specials that feature Black Hat and Dr. Flug criticizing villains from other Cartoon Network shows (which is take place in the timelines of history). The Q&A special is an exception, at 14 minutes and without a focus on a particular villain.

Reception
The reception of the series has been relatively positive. In June 2017, Victor Pineda Trujillo said that the mini-shorts had "a touch of humor from the 90's cartoons," is about overcoming demons of your life, has wonderful artwork, and a great message. In 2019, E.M. Lee reviewed the show's pilot, noting the enormous fanbase of the series, said the pilot was worth waiting for, and argues that the episode is very creative, having "highly entertaining" characters, which have an interesting dynamic with each other. Lee also praised the animation and argued that it introduces the "core set pieces" of the series, giving the audience "enough to get them interested in the rest of the series." Other reviewers said that Villainous is suited for fans of The Grim Adventures of Billy & Mandy and Invader Zim while some said it gained online popularity for "lampooning popular Cartoon Network Shows." In March 2018, Catherine Lencione of Michigan Journal, a student publication of the University of Michigan–Dearborn, called the show unique and fun, with "colorful animation and character designs," saying it has the possibility of evolving "into something great."

In other media
Black Hat makes a cameo in the OK K.O.! Let's Be Heroes episode, "Crossover Nexus". It was later revealed in the Q&A special that this was actually an identical duplicate of Black Hat that was created in the short, "Perception of Evil".
The Black Hat Magisword, which debuted in the Villainous short, "The Lost Cases of Rhyboflavin", makes subsequent cameos in the second-season episodes of Mighty Magiswords, including "Ghosthaste".
A crossover with Victor and Valentino entitled "Villainy In Monte Macabre" premiered on October 19, 2020, on the US Cartoon Network, with the cast reprising their roles, serving as a backdoor pilot for the Villainous television series. In the special, Victor and Valentino team up with Dr. Flug and Demencia to try to find a squid monster who is disguised as a human in Monte Macabre, unaware that the monster is the hero and they are the villains. The events of this crossover special take place during the second season of Victor and Valentino.
Some characters have official Instagram accounts where their progress can be seen.

Notes

References

External links
Black Hat official website
YouTube playlist of various shorts put together by Cartoon Network Latin America

Cartoon Network original programming
Cartoon Network franchises
Comedy web series
2017 web series debuts
Mexican children's animated comedy television series
Mexican children's animated fantasy television series
Mexican children's animated horror television series
Animated web series
Television series about revenge
Supervillain television shows
Crossover fiction